Otto Armin Smiseth (born 26 July 1949) is a Norwegian professor of medicine.

Hailing from Asker, he took his cand.med. degree at the University of Oslo in 1975 and his dr.med. degree at the University of Tromsø in 1993. His speciality is cardiac physiology. In 1995 he became a professor at the University of Oslo and Rikshospitalet. He is a member of the Norwegian Academy of Science and Letters.

References

1949 births
Living people
People from Asker
Norwegian physicians
University of Oslo alumni
University of Tromsø alumni
Academic staff of the University of Oslo
Oslo University Hospital people
Members of the Norwegian Academy of Science and Letters